The common death adder (Acanthophis antarcticus) is a species of death adder native to Australia. It is one of the most venomous land snakes in Australia and globally. While it remains widespread (unlike related species), it is facing increased threat from the ongoing Australian cane toad invasion.

Taxonomy
The common death adder was first described in 1802. The common death adder feeds on frogs, lizards and birds and, unlike most Australian venomous snakes that actively search for prey, this snake sits in one place and waits for prey to come to it.

Description
The common death adder has a broad flattened, triangular head and a thick body with bands of red, brown and black with a grey, cream or pink belly. Death adders possess the longest fangs of any Australian snake. Unlike the common or European adder (Vipera berus), the common death adder is a member of the snake family Elapidae, rather than the family Viperidae, which are not found in Australia.

Distribution and habitat
The common death adder occurs over much of eastern and coastal southern Australia – Queensland, New South Wales and South Australia. It is more scarce in the Northern Territory, Western Australia and the west parts of South Australia, and is no longer found in Victoria. It is also native to Papua.

Common death adders are found in forests, woodlands, grasslands and heaths of the eastern coast of Australia. Thanks to its band stripes, the death adder is a master of camouflage, hiding beneath loose leaf litter and debris in woodland, shrubland and grassland.

Concerns
Habitat loss and the spread of invasive cane toads are a concern. The toad eats young death adders and adult death adders that eat the toads are poisoned by the toxic glands on their skin.

Diet 
Common death adders eat small mammals and birds as a primary diet. Unlike other snakes, the common death adder lies in wait for its prey (often for many days) until a meal passes. It covers itself with leaves—making itself inconspicuous—and lies coiled in ambush, twitching its grub-like tail close to its head as a lure. When an animal approaches to investigate the movement, the death adder quickly strikes, injecting its venom and then waits for the victim to die before eating it. The death adder is not aggressive, yet its ambush hunting technique and reliance on camouflage rather than flight to avoid threats renders it more dangerous to humans who venture into bushland habitats.

Reproduction 
Unlike most snakes, death adders produce litters of live young. In the late summer, a female death adder will produce a litter of live offspring, approximately 3–20; however, over 30 young have been recorded in a single litter.

References

External links 

 Reptile Park
 The Australian Zoo 
 Natural Born Killers (ITA)

Acanthophis
Reptiles of Western Australia
Reptiles described in 1802
Reptiles of Queensland
Reptiles of New South Wales
Snakes of Australia